Devil's Bridge is a natural rock arch in eastern Antigua. The area around the arch features several natural blowholes which shoot up water and spray powered by waves from the Atlantic Ocean. This particular location is exposed to waves that are pushed by the Trade Winds with no land between here and Europe. Nearby popular local swimming spots such as Long Cove are sheltered by an offshore reef acts as a natural breakwater.
In 2008 it was declared National Park.

See also 
 Hell's Gate Island

References 

Landforms of Antigua and Barbuda